Ágnes Fodor (born 31 March 1964) is a Hungarian backstroke swimmer. She competed in three events at the 1980 Summer Olympics.

References

1964 births
Living people
Hungarian female backstroke swimmers
Olympic swimmers of Hungary
Swimmers at the 1980 Summer Olympics
Sportspeople from Eger